Scaddan is a small town in Western Australia located  east of Perth situated just off the Coolgardie-Esperance Highway between Norseman and Esperance in the Goldfields-Esperance region of Western Australia.

The area was originally known as Thirty Mile, because of its distance from Esperance. The British settled the area before 1914 and were commonly using the name Scaddan at around that time. The name of the post office was changed from Thirty Mile to Scaddan in 1915 and by 1916 a school and hall had been built in the town. The government delayed declaring the town until the route of the Norseman-Esperance railway was settled. The townsite was finally gazetted in 1924.

The town is named after John "Happy Jack" Scaddan, the premier of Western Australia from 1911 to 1916 and a prominent advocate of the Esperance railway.

References 

Shire of Esperance